Neither Storm Nor Quake Nor Fire is the only album of metalcore band Demise of Eros. It was released on August 22, 2006.

Critical reception
Josh from Indie Vision Music writes: "The band definitely has talent but need a guiding hand to direct their abilities into a smoother result. As of right now, the potential can be seen, but the band probably wont be able to stand out amongst the hordes of metalcore groups out there. I look at this album the same way I looked at War Of Ages’ debut. You could hear the overflowing potential of WOA but they needed to really clean up their sound and work out a few kinks, which they successfully did. Demise Of Eros, with the same work effort, have the same bright future ahead of them!"

Track listing

Credits
Demise of Eros
 Darren Belajac - Vocals
 Steve Stout - Guitar, Vocals
 John Erickson - Guitar
 Will Curtis - Bass
 Joey Solak - Drums
Production
 Dave Quiggle - Artwork, Layout Design 
 Doug White - Engineer, Producer, Impersonations

References

2006 debut albums
Demise of Eros albums